Saprinus ornatus is a species of clown beetles belonging to the family Histeridae.

Description
Elytra are black, with two orange markings.

Distribution
This species is present in the European Turkey, in North Africa, Northern Asia (excluding China) and Southern Asia.

References

External links
 Atlas of clown beetles (Histeridae) of Russia
 List of Egyptian insects in the collection of the Ministry of agriculture

Histeridae
Beetles described in 1834